Music for Crying is a compilation album by Kramer, released in August 1995 by Creativeman Disc. It comprises recordings made between 1985 and 1994, covering both his solo and collaborative work.

Track listing

Personnel 
Adapted from Music for Crying liner notes.

 Kramer – vocals, instruments, production, engineering

Release history

References

External links 
 Music for Crying at Discogs (list of releases)

1995 compilation albums
Kramer (musician) albums
Albums produced by Kramer (musician)